Quinten J. Strange (born 21 August 1996) is a New Zealand rugby union player who currently plays as a lock for  in the Bunnings NPC and the  in the Super Rugby competition.

Early career
Strange was born in the small town of Tākaka and raised in the rural community of Collingwood. He attended Nelson College where he captained their top side.

Senior career
Strange was named in the Tasman Mako squad for the 2016 Mitre 10 Cup aged just 19 and instantly established himself as a regular, making 11 appearances, 10 of which were from the start and scoring 2 tries as the side finished runners up in the Premiership. Strange was vice captain of the Tasman Mako side that won the 2019 Mitre 10 Cup. Strange was named as co captain of the Tasman Mako squad for the 2021 Bunnings NPC alongside Mitchell Hunt with the absence of regular captain David Havili due to All Blacks duties. In the premiership semifinal of the competition against  Strange played his 50th game for Tasman in a 27–33 win for the Mako.

Super Rugby
After just one season and 11 appearances at provincial level, he was handed a Super Rugby contract by the  ahead of the 2017 Super Rugby season. The move saw him link up with his former New Zealand Under 20 coach Scott Robertson who was in his debut season with the Crusaders having formerly coached . Strange was part of the  team that won Super Rugby three times in a row in 2017, 2018 and 2019 and also the Super Rugby Aotearoa competition in 2020. Strange captained the side in Round 3 of the 2022 Super Rugby Pacific season against .

International
Strange was a member of the New Zealand Under 20 side which competed in the 2016 World Rugby Under 20 Championship in England where he made 5 appearances and scored 2 tries. Strange was named in the All Blacks squad for the 2020 Rugby Championship but later suffered an ankle injury which saw him miss the tournament.

References

External links

1996 births
Living people
Crusaders (rugby union) players
New Zealand rugby union players
People educated at Nelson College
People from Tākaka
Rugby union locks
Rugby union players from the Tasman District
Tasman rugby union players